Caselani (full name Caselani Automobili) is an Italian coachbuilder, which notably offers modification kits for contemporary Citroën commercial vehicles in a retro style.

History

Since 2017, Caselani has offered kits to modify a Citroën Jumper to give it a Citroën Type H appearance. In February 2018, the HG kit makes it possible to modify the Jumpy and Spacetourer (the two letters being linked respectively to the Type H and Type G). In October 2022, a kit was unveiled to make the Citroën Berlingo look like a 2CV Fourgonnette, due to be launched in January 2023.

Models
 Fourgonnette
 Type HG
 Type H

References

External links
 

Coachbuilders of Italy
Companies of Italy